Tsutomu "Tom" Shimura (born September 2, 1972), better known by his stage name Lyrics Born (formerly Asia Born), is a Japanese-American rapper, singer, and producer. He is one half of the duo Latyrx with Lateef the Truthspeaker.

Early life
Shimura was born in Tokyo and raised in Salt Lake City, Utah and Berkeley, California. He attended Henry B. Plant High School in Tampa, Florida.

Career
Shimura changed his stage name from Asia Born to Lyrics Born in 1995, citing the desire to ensure that he won fans based on his merits as a rapper rather than his ethnicity. His first studio album, Later That Day, was released on Quannum Projects in 2003.

Lyrics Born's collaborations with Lateef the Truthspeaker on Latyrx records often see them trading lyrics back and forth in quick succession. Lyrics Born and Lateef's methodology for writing this type of lyric is described by Lateef in the book How to Rap: "With Latyrx stuff, when we have parts that we're writing that we're both going to be trading off, we write them together for the most part. I'll sit there and write a rhyme, like I'll write a line or two and then we'll break up who's gonna say what, and he'll write a line or two and we'll break up who's gonna say what. It's a very organic process."

Discography

Studio albums
Lyrics Born
 Later That Day... (2003, Quannum Projects)
 Everywhere at Once (2008, Epitaph Records)
 As U Were (2010, Mobile Home Recordings/Decon Media)
 Real People (2015, Mobile Home Recordings)
 Quite a Life (2018, Mobile Home Recordings)
 Mobile Homies Season 1 (2022, Mobile Home Recordings)

Latyrx (Lyrics Born with Lateef the Truthspeaker)
 The Album (1997, Solesides)
 The Second Album (2013, Latyramid)

Quannum MCs (Lyrics Born with Chief Xcel, DJ Shadow, Gift of Gab & Lateef the Truth Speaker)
 Quannum Spectrum (Quannum Projects, 1999)

Other releases
Remix albums
 Same !@#$ Different Day (2005, Quannum Projects)
 As U Were (Remixes) (2012, Mobile Home Recordings/Decon Media)

Live albums
 Overnite Encore: Lyrics Born Live (2006, Quannum Projects)

A capella albums
 A Capella's Vol. 1 (2008)

EPs
 The Muzapper's Mixes (1998, Solesides) (Latyrx)
 Bad Dreams (2005, Jam Recordings)
 Disconnection EP (2012, Mobile Home Recordings/Latyramid) (Latyrx)
 Rapp Nite (2019, Mobile Home Recordings) (with Cutso)

Mixtapes
 Lyrics Born Variety Show Season One (2005, Mobile Home Recordings)
 Lyrics Born Variety Show Season Two (2006, Mobile Home Recordings)
 Lyrics Born Variety Show Season Three (2008, Mobile Home Recordings)
 Lyrics Born Variety Show Season Pho (2009, Mobile Home Recordings)
 Latyrical Madness, Vol. 1 (2011, Mobile Home Recordings/Latyramid) (Latyrx)
 Lyrics Born Variety Show Season Five: On the Floor (2012, Mobile Home Recordings/Decon Media)
 Lyrics Born Variety Show Season Six (2014, Mobile Home Recordings)
 Lyrics Born Variety Show Season Seven (2016, Mobile Home Recordings)

Compilation albums
 "Now Look What You've Done, Lyrics Born!" – Greatest Hits! (2016, Mobile Home Recordings)

Singles
 "Send Them" (1993, Solesides)
 "Latyrx" (1995, Solesides)
 "Burnt Pride" (1996, Solesides)
 "Balcony Beach" (1996, Solesides)
 "Lady Don't Tek No" (1998, Solesides) (Latyrx)
 "I Changed My Mind" (1999, Quannum Projects)
 "Hello" b/w "One Session" (2003, Mobile Home Recordings/Quannum Projects)
 "Callin' Out" (2003, Mobile Home Recordings/Quannum Projects)
 "Callin' Out Remix" b/w "Do That There Remix" (2004, Mobile Home Recordings/Quannum Projects)
 "I'm Just Raw" b/w "Pack Up Remix" (2005, Mobile Home Recordings/Quannum Projects)
 "Big Money Talk" (2006, Decon Recordings)
 "I Like It, I Love It" (2008, Mobile Home Recordings/Anti- Records)
 "Differences" (2008, Mobile Home Recordings/Anti- Records)
 "Top Shelf" (2008, Mobile Home Recordings/Anti-Records)
 "Hott 2 Deff" (2008, Mobile Home Recordings/Anti- Records)
 "Whispers" (2008, Mobile Home Recordings/Anti- Records)
 "Funky Hit Records" (2009, Mobile Home Recordings)
 "Pushed Aside, Pulled Apart" (2009, Mobile Home Recordings)
 "Oh Baby" (2009, Mobile Home Recordings)
 "Lies X 3" (2010, Mobile Home Recordings/Decon Recordings)

Additional credits
Guest appearances
 Blackalicious – "Deep in the Jungle" from Melodica (1994)
 Blackalicious – "Release" from Blazing Arrow (2002)
 Diverse – "Explosive" from One A.M. (2003)
 Tommy Guerrero – "Gettin' It Together" from Soul Food Taqueria (2003)
 Lifesavas – "Emerge" from Spirit in Stone (2003)
 Haiku D'Etat – "Top Qualified" from Coup de Theatre (2004)
 Blackalicious – "Give It to You" from The Craft (2005)
 DJ Z-Trip – "The Get Down" from Shifting Gears (2005)
 The Mighty Underdogs – "Ill Vacation" from Droppin' Science Fiction (2008)
 Joyo Velarde – "Strong Possibility" from Love & Understanding (2010)
 Lateef the Truthspeaker – "Hardship Enterprise" from Firewire (2011)
 Suburban Legends – "Can't Stop It" from Day Job (2012)
 Lotus – "Cannon in the Heavens" from Monks (2013)

Production credits
 Blackalicious – "Do This My Way" from Nia (1999)
 R. L. Burnside – "Goin' Down South" and "Someday Baby" from A Bothered Mind (2004)

Tracks appear on
 "I Changed My Mind" on Quannum Spectrum (1999)
 "Send Them" on Solesides Greatest Bumps (2000)

References

External links 

 
 
 

1972 births
American people of Italian descent
American rappers of East Asian descent
Epitaph Records artists
Japanese emigrants to the United States
Living people
Musicians from Berkeley, California
People from Tokyo
Quannum Projects artists
Rappers from the San Francisco Bay Area
21st-century American rappers
Japanese people of Italian descent
Anti- (record label) artists